Daniel B. Lloyd (born November 9, 1953) is a former American football linebacker who played four seasons in the National Football League for the New York Giants. He played college football at the University of Washington and was drafted in the sixth round (162nd overall) of the 1976 NFL Draft.  Dan Lloyd was a California High School Individual Wrestling Champion from James Lick High School - following the path blazed earlier at James Lick by (Heisman Trophy winner) Jim Plunkett. 

After four years with the Giants, Lloyd contracted cancer in March 1980 and was pronounced cured in March 1982.  He was then in the 1983 training camp of the New Jersey Generals

See also
 Washington Huskies football statistical leaders

References

External links
 NFL.com player page
 Pro Football Reference profile

1953 births
Living people
People from Heber City, Utah
American football linebackers
Washington Huskies football players
New York Giants players
Players of American football from Utah